Oxyurichthys lemayi, commonly known as the lace goby, is a species of goby found in the western Indian Ocean (Delagoa Bay, Mozambique).

References

Hoese, D.F., 1986. Gobiidae. p. 774-807. In M.M. Smith and P.C. Heemstra (eds.) Smiths' sea fishes. Springer-Verlag, Berlin. 

lemayi
Taxa named by J. L. B. Smith
Fish described in 1947